The Bear at Home (now the Bear Inn) is an English 16th-century public house in the South Oxfordshire village of North Moreton, near Wallingford. It retains many original 16th-century features, including timber-framed walls, inglenook fireplace and a well, and was extended in 1980 to allow it to serve food.  As recently as 1930, there were four pubs in this small village, serving a population of about 400 people.

References

Pubs in Oxfordshire